Pseudephedranthus is a genus of flowering plants belonging to the family Annonaceae.

Its native range is Northern South America to Northern Brazil.

Species:

Pseudephedranthus enigmaticus 
Pseudephedranthus fragrans

References

Annonaceae
Annonaceae genera